Emily Odoemenam (born c. 1975) is a Nigerian former sprinter. She competed in local and international competitions in athletics representing Nigeria. She won silver and bronze medals at the 1990 African Championships in Athletics and another silver at the 1993 African Championships in Athletics at 200 and 400 metres events.
Emily also participated at the 1993 World Championships in Athletics – Women's 4 × 400 metres relay alongside Omolade Akinremi, Omotayo Akinremi and Olabisi Afolabi.

Achievements

Personal bests
200 metres hurdles – 22:59 s (1990)
400 metres – 51.68 s (1990)

See also
Omotayo Akinremi

References

 

Living people
Nigerian female hurdlers
Year of birth missing (living people)
20th-century Nigerian women